Dark Times: The Path to Nowhere is the first story arc in the Dark Times series of comic books written by Mick Harrison from a plot by Welles Hartley. The first issue was published on November 8, 2006, by Dark Horse Comics. The series is set in the Star Wars universe shortly after the events in Star Wars: Episode III – Revenge of the Sith, and about 19 years before Star Wars Episode IV: A New Hope. The story begins in the days following the events in Purge by John Ostrander, and intertwines with the events of Dark Lord: The Rise of Darth Vader by James Luceno.

Issues
 Dark Times 1: The Path to Nowhere, Part 1
 Dark Times 2: The Path to Nowhere, Part 2
 Dark Times 3: The Path to Nowhere, Part 3
 Dark Times 4: The Path to Nowhere, Part 4
 Dark Times 5: The Path to Nowhere, Part 5

Covers

See also
 Star Wars: Dark Times
 Star Wars: Episode III – Revenge of the Sith
 Star Wars: Purge
 Dark Lord: The Rise of Darth Vader

External links
 Dark Horse Listing for Issue #1

2006 comics debuts
Comics based on Star Wars